Tso may refer to:

 Tso language, a Savanna language of eastern Nigeria

 Tso or Ts'o, several Chinese surnames (e.g., Cao) in dialect or Wade–Giles romanization, which may refer to:
 Zuo Zongtang or General Tso (左宗棠)
 Theodore Ts'o, a software developer mainly known for his contributions to the Linux kernel

See also 
 TSO (disambiguation)